The Man with Bogart's Face (also called Sam Marlowe, Private Eye) is a 1980 American comedy film, released by 20th Century Fox and based on a novel of the same name. Andrew J. Fenady, author of the novel, produced the film and wrote the screenplay.

Plot summary
A man calling himself Sam Marlowe (Robert Sacchi) has his face altered to resemble that of his idol, Humphrey Bogart, and then opens a detective agency. At first, he and his secretary Duchess (Misty Rowe) have meager business, but things pick up after a shooting puts Sam's picture in the paper. Some ruthless people, who are coincidentally also similar to characters in Bogart films (and played by Victor Buono, Herbert Lom, and Michelle Phillips), are after a priceless set of blue sapphires called the Eyes of Alexander (from a statue of Alexander the Great), and Marlowe and Duchess are caught in the middle of it all.

Cast
Robert Sacchi – Sam Marlowe
Franco Nero – Hakim 
Michelle Phillips – Gena 
Olivia Hussey – Elsa 
Herbert Lom – Mr. Zebra 
Misty Rowe – Duchess 
Victor Buono – Commodore Anastas 
Sybil Danning – Cynthia 
Richard Bakalyan – Lieutenant Bumbera 
Gregg Palmer – Sergeant Hacksaw 
Jay Robinson – Wolf/Zinderneuf 
George Raft – Petey Cane 
Yvonne De Carlo – Teresa Anastas 
Mike Mazurki – Himself 
Henry Wilcoxon – Mr. Chevalier 
Victor Sen Yung – Mr. Wing

Original novel
The film was based on the debut novel by Andrew J. Fenady who wrote it in long hand over 23 days. Fenady had been writer and producer of television shows and movies for 30 years and was always interested in turning it into a film.

In June 1976 it was announced that Fenady's book would be published next January and that a film version would follow.
"Whatever the author had in mind does not come off very well," wrote the book critic of The New York Times, adding "the conception and writing are pretty sophomoric." The Los Angeles Times said Fenady "writes well".

The book was popular enough for a sequel The Secret of Sam Marlow: The Further Adventures of the Man with Bogart's Face.

Production
Fenday took the film to Mel Simon who agreed to provide $4 million. Fenady says he wound up not needing all that money and returned $400,000 to Simon. "I'm a Depression baby, I don't believe in wasting money," he said.

The film was made in May 1979 with independently raised finance from Melvin Simon Productions. In September 1979, when the movie was in post-production, 20th Century Fox agreed to pick up all Melvin Simon's movies made in 1979 and 1980 in a deal worth an estimated $10 million. They had a fifty percent interest in Bogart, meaning Fox paid Simon $2 million.

Star Robert Sacchi was noted for his resemblance to Bogart and had appeared as Bogart in various roles for over a decade, including various commercials, a Broadway production of Play It Again Sam. He had toured America for four years in a one man show Bogie's Back. "I'm just a working guy trying to make an honest living," he said. "I look the way I do and I always have, and there's not much I can do about it. I never had plastic surgery or wore makeup to look like Bogie."

Fenady said he cast another actor in the role until Sacchi walked in, after which the producer "went into shock. Bob doesn't need to do an impersonation. The physical impact is enough. When he began talking, I knew I had Bogart."

During the filming of one scene, a boat hit John Wayne's converted minesweeper.

It was the last film for George Raft.

Reception
The film debuted at the 1980 Cannes Film Festival and was released in Europe before debuting in the US.

The New York Times called it "an intelligent, amiable and often amusing spoof of Humphrey Bogart and the roles he played" although "everyone is so cool that there are moments when the picture seems about to drift off the screen."

Notes
 The name Sam Marlowe is taken from two film characters played by Bogart: Sam Spade in The Maltese Falcon and Philip Marlowe in The Big Sleep.
 Appearing in this film are screen veterans George Raft (in his last film role), Jay Robinson, Henry Wilcoxon, Victor Sen Yung (who had appeared with Humphrey Bogart in Across the Pacific), Victor Buono, Yvonne De Carlo, Mike Mazurki, and Franco Nero.
 The film won the first Golden Raspberry Award for Worst Original Song for "The Man with Bogart's Face".

Home media
The film was released on DVD by Image Entertainment on July 10, 2007.

References

External links
 
 
 

1980 films
1980s comedy mystery films
20th Century Fox films
American comedy mystery films
American detective films
Films scored by George Duning
Films based on American novels
Films directed by Robert Day
Golden Raspberry Award winning films
Cultural depictions of Humphrey Bogart
1980 comedy films
1980s English-language films
1980s American films